Meltdown is a light gun shooter video game developed by Atari Corporation and published in 1990 for the Atari 7800. It is one of the few games compatible with the Atari XG-1 light gun accessory.

Plot 
This game is set in a world where international terrorists have threatened to destroy the world. To accomplish this, the terrorists unleashed a weapon known as "sparkx" to attack 20 nuclear reactors. This weapon attacks the control rods of each reactor until forcing a nuclear meltdown. The player takes on the role of an unnamed hero tasked with destroying the sparkx within each reactor to save the world.

Gameplay 
The object of the game is to protect the 20 nuclear reactor cores from sparkx. At the title screen, the player chooses one or two players and novice or expert difficulty.

The player must shoot the sparkx before they damage the reactor core. If the player misses, a barrier temporarily appears. A maximum of four barriers can appear at a time. Sparkx will bounce off of the barriers adding a defensive strategy to the game. Sometimes power ups will appear on screen called power crystals and bonus blocks. The playfield area eventually shrinks, constraining the shooting area. If the reactor survives at the end of the round, the player is assigned a password to continue progress later, or can shoot to continue to the next reactor.

The game ends when either the control rods are destroyed or if the player saves all 20 reactors.

Reception 

Videogamecritic.com gave the game a C− in 1999, citing "boring" graphics and "too easy" gameplay.

References 

Light gun games
1990 video games
Atari 7800 games
Atari 7800-only games
Video games about nuclear technology
Video games about terrorism
Video games developed in the United States